The 1976 Virginia State Elections took place on Election Day, November 2, 1976, the same day as the U.S. Presidential, U.S. Senate, U.S. House elections in the state. The only statewide elections on the ballot were six constitutional referendums  to amend the Virginia State Constitution. All referendums were referred to the voters by the Virginia General Assembly.

Question 1

This amendment asked voters to eliminate the length of residence as a qualification to vote and to extend the time a voter may vote in their precinct after moving from it.

Question 2

This amendment asked voters to permit absentee voter registration.  This was enacted in response to the Overseas Citizens Voting Rights Act of 1975 signed by U.S. President Gerald Ford.

Question 3

This amendment asked voters to specify that the requirement of 1 year's residence in Virginia for office seekers be the year preceding election to office.

Question 4

This amendment asked voters to remove the restriction against certain public officials and public employees serving as assistant or substitute voter registrars or election officers.  Although the amendment was rejected by voters, a narrower measure was approved 10 years later in 1986.

Question 5

This amendment asked voters to permit judicial appointments of elected local officials and eliminate the need for special elections to fill a vacancy for less than 60 days.

Question 6

This amendment asked voters to permit certain tax exemptions for property subject to a perpetual easement for flooding, property owned by permanently and totally disabled residents, property used for solar energy purposes, and tangible farm property and products.

References

1976 Virginia elections